Hubs, formerly 3D Hubs, is an online manufacturing platform that offers businesses on-demand access to a global network of manufacturing partners. The platform offers a range of manufacturing services, including 3D printing, CNC machining, injection molding and sheet metal fabrication services.

Company

The company was originally founded in April 2013 by Bram de Zwart and Brian Garret, with Filemon Schöffer later joining the founding team. Headquartered in Amsterdam, the company opened its second office and North American headquarters in Chicago in May, 2019. The company also has offices in Paris and Berlin.

In January 2021, Minnesota-based Protolabs, a publicly-traded custom manufacturer, announced an agreement to acquire the company for $280 million in cash and stock, plus incentives. In May 2021, the company renamed from 3D Hubs to Hubs.

Industry reports & initiatives

The company releases regular reports on leading trends and developments within the manufacturing industry, including the 3D Printing Trend Report and the Supply Chain Resilience Report. Hubs also runs a yearly student grant with the aim of encouraging and supporting engineering students in their development of innovative projects. In 2020, Hubs launched the COVID-19 Manufacturing fund, to help fund and manufacture vital protective equipment such as face shields for hospitals in need during the onset of the COVID-19 pandemic.

Awards
 In 2014, Wired UK named 3D Hubs Startup of the Week.
 In 2018, 3D Hubs won the Dutch market challenger award by Sprout.
 In 2019 and 2020, Hubs was named amongst the Deloitte Fast 50 list of fastest growing technology companies in the Netherlands. 
 In 2020, 3D Hubs CEO Bram de Zwart was named in Business Insider's list of 100 leaders transforming business in Europe.

See also

3D Printing
3D Printing Marketplace

References

3D printing websites
Online companies of the Netherlands
Companies based in Amsterdam
2013 establishments in the Netherlands